The Department Assembly of Valle del Cauca is the department assembly of the Colombian Valle del Cauca Department. The assembly is part of the Colombian legislative branch of government at a Provincial level and its main function is to debate, approve or change the local ordinances.

History

The history of the Department Assembly of Valle del Cauca has its roots in the creation of the Valle del Cauca Department.

Hostage crisis

As part of the Colombian armed conflict on April 12, 2002, members of the Revolutionary Armed Forces of Colombia (FARC) stormed the Department Assembly of Valle del Cauca and kidnapped 12 Deputies of the Valle del Cauca Department to pressure a prisoner exchange between them and the government and to negotiate the demilitarization of the municipalities of Florida and Pradera to initiate peace dialogues.

Functions

The Department Assembly of Valle del Cauca sessions regularly in ordinary sessions during six months in three periods of two months and can be prolonged for up to ten days. Extraordinary sessions can be called up by the Governor of Valle del Cauca to analyze certain projects specifically. The deputies are in charge of analyzing for approval or disapproval of ordinances after three discussion debates that once approved are then sanctioned and signed by the Governor of Valle del Cauca.

Organization

The Department Assembly of Valle del Cauca is headed by the Mesa Directiva (literally "Directorate Table") which is integrated by the President of the Department Assembly of Valle del Cauca, First Vice President, Second Vice President and General Secretary.

Members 

Since the 2015 regional elections, the members of the Department Assembly of Valle del Cauca for the 2016–2019 term are:

2008-2011 term 

Notes

See also

Governor of Valle del Cauca Department
List of Colombian Department Assemblies
Legislative Branch of Colombia

References

External links
 Department Assembly of Valle del Cauca official website

Government of Valle del Cauca Department
Colombian department assemblies
Valle del Cauca